Major General Gerald Mark Strickland,  is a senior British Army officer.

Military career
Strickland was commissioned into 6th Queen Elizabeth's Own Gurkha Rifles on 3 September 1989. He was appointed a Member of the Order of the British Empire in the 2006 New Year Honours. He undertook a tour in Afghanistan as commanding officer of the 1st Battalion, Royal Gurkha Rifles in Helmand Province in 2010, for which he was awarded the Distinguished Service Order. He went on to become commander of the 4th Infantry Brigade and Headquarters North East in May 2015, Head of Operations (Military) at the Ministry of Defence in January 2017, and Deputy Commanding General-Support, III Corps and Fort Hood in May 2019. After that he became General Officer Commanding 6th (United Kingdom) Division in September 2021.

References

British Army generals
British Army personnel of the War in Afghanistan (2001–2021)
Companions of the Distinguished Service Order
Living people
Members of the Order of the British Empire
Recipients of the Commendation for Valuable Service
Year of birth missing (living people)